Bidri is an Arab tribe mainly inhabiting Kozluk and Sason in Turkey.

Language
The Arabic dialect spoken by the tribe is substantially different and not intelligible with those spoken in Şanlıurfa, Mardin, and Hatay in Turkey, as well as in the Arab world.

History
Arabs in the region coexisted with Armenians, but eventually, most took part in the massacre of Armenians with the exception of a few tribes.

Sub-tribes
Bidri is made up of several sub-tribes:
Zekeri
Musi
Sarmi
Jalali
Khazali
Bederi (Bidri)
Shigo

References

Ethnic groups in Turkey